Diego Vallejo Folgueira (born 13 February 1973) is a Spanish rally co-driver. He won the Spanish Rally Championship with his brother Sergio Vallejo twice, in 2009 and 2014. In 2010 he co-drove with Dani Sordo for the Citroën World Rally Team, in five rallies. He also co-drove for the privateer Albert Llovera in 2010, as well in 2011 and 2012.

WRC results

References

External links 

 Diego Vallejo's Complete WRC starts
 

Spanish rally co-drivers
1973 births
Living people
Dakar Rally co-drivers